Theodore H. Morrison was an American football coach.  He was the first head football coach at Fairmount College—now known as Wichita State University—in Wichita, Kansas and he held that position for the 1897 season.  His overall record at Fairmount was 1–0.  The lone game he coached was a victory over Wichita High School by a score of 12–4.

Head coaching record

References

Year of birth missing
Year of death missing
Wichita State Shockers football coaches